James John Patterson (1859–1937) was a New Zealand blacksmith, farmer and landowner. He was born in New Plymouth, Taranaki, New Zealand in 1859.

References

1859 births
1937 deaths
People from New Plymouth
New Zealand blacksmiths